The 1950 Cupa României Final was the 13th final of Romania's most prestigious football cup competition. It was disputed between CCA București and Flamura Roşie Arad, and was won by CCA București after a game with 4 goals. It was the second cup title in the history of CCA București.

Match details

See also 
List of Cupa României finals

References

External links
Romaniansoccer.ro

1950
Cupa
Romania